Oziotelphusa hippocastanum is a species of crustacean in the family Parathelphusidae. It is endemic to Sri Lanka.  Its natural habitats are subtropical or tropical moist lowland forests, subtropical or tropical swamps, and rivers. It is threatened by habitat loss.

References

Gecarcinucoidea
Freshwater crustaceans of Asia
Crustaceans of Sri Lanka
Endemic fauna of Sri Lanka
Crustaceans described in 1887
Taxa named by Fritz Müller (doctor)
Taxonomy articles created by Polbot
Taxobox binomials not recognized by IUCN